Lulwa (لولوة) is an Arabic given name for females. It is derived from the word  lu’lú’a, meaning "pearl". People named Lulwa include:

 Lulwa Al Awadhi, Bahraini women's rights advocate
 Lolowah bint Faisal Al Saud, Saudi Arabian princess  

Arabic feminine given names